Northeast Institute of Biblical and Theological Studies (NIBTS) is a private Religious Institute located in Corinth, NY. NIBTS is run under Full Gospel Fellowship

History
NIBTS was established by Reverend Thomas Switala in 2013 and began its first classes on September 15, 2014 with 5 students for its first class. It was run out of Full Gospel Assembly in Corinth, NY and operated under Full Gospel Fellowship.

Campus
The current campus of NIBTS is located at Full Gospel Assembly in Corinth, NY

Academics
NIBTS currently offers small solutions for degrees and certificates being a new institute.

Admissions
NIBTS uses a trimester system for its school year. Applications can be made throughout the year to begin classes and will be reviewed by the admissions staff. Current application approval percentage is 100% based on the first semester of applicants.

Courses and opportunities
NIBTS is a small and young Institute, offering two degrees and two certificates for students interested in attending.  Students can currently learn by attending the campus but solutions for distant learning are in the works
 Certificate of Biblical Studies
 Christian Worker's Certificate
 Baccalaureate Degree in Biblical Studies
 Associate Degree in Biblical Studies

References

External links
 Northeast Institute of Biblical and Theological Studies - Official Web Site

Pentecostal seminaries and theological colleges
Seminaries and theological colleges in New York (state)
Educational institutions established in 2013
2013 establishments in New York (state)
Evangelical seminaries and theological colleges in the United States